New Zealand competed in the 2010 Commonwealth Games held in Delhi, India, from 3 to 14 October 2010.

Medal table

| width="78%" align="left" valign="top" |

| style="text-align:left; vertical-align:top;"|

Aquatics

Swimming 
Men
  

Women

Diving 
 Gabrielle Armstrong-Scott: 1m Springboard | 10m Platform

Archery

New Zealand sent a team of three men and three women. They competed in the compound bow individual and team events.

Men

Women

Athletics

New Zealand sent a team of 12 track and field athletes.

Men
Track

Field – Throws

Combined

Women
Track

Field – Throws

Field – Jumps

Combined

Cycling

Track

Men
  

Women

Men's Track
 Shane Archbold
 Sam Bewley
 Eddie Dawkins
 Westley Gough
 Peter Latham
 Ethan Mitchell
 Marc Ryan
 Jesse Sergent
 Myron Simpson
 Simon Van Velthooven
 Sam Webster

Men's Road
 Jack Bauer
 Greg Henderson
 Gordon McCauley
 Hayden Roulston

Women's Track
 Kaytee Boyd
 Rushlee Buchanan
 Gemma Dudley
 Lauren Ellis
 Joanne Kiesanowski
 Jaime Nielsen
 Alison Shanks

Women's Road
 Catherine Cheatley
 Melissa Holt
 Linda Villumsen

Gymnastics

Artistic
Men

Men's Artistic

 Misha Koudinov
 Matthew Palmer
 Patrick Peng
 Mark Holyoake
 Brandon Field

Women's Artistic

 Holly Moon
 Lani Hohepa
 Jordan Rae
 Briana Mitchell

Rhythmic
 Keziah Oliver
 Kimberley Robson
 Mereana Rademekers

Hockey

Men
New Zealand Squad: 
Phil Burrows, Simon Child, Dean Couzins, Steve Edwards, Nick Haig, Andrew Hayward, Blair Hilton, Hugo Inglis, Stephen Jenness, Shea McAleese, Arun Panchia, Kyle Pontifex, Bradley Shaw, Hayden Shaw, Blair Tarrant, Nick Wilson.

Pool B

Semi-final

Bronze medal match

Women
Black Sticks Squad: 
Kayla Sharland, Emily Naylor, Krystal Forgesson, Katie Glynn, Stacey Carr, Ella Gunson, Beth Jurgeleit, Clarissa Eshuis, Lucy Talbot, Samantha Harrison, Gemma Flynn, Anna Thorpe, Natasha Fitzsimons, Charlotte Harrison, Stacey Michelsen, Anita Punt.

Pool B

Semi-final

Gold medal match

Netball

The Silver Ferns consist of 12 netball players.

Women
Liana Leota, Leana de Bruin, Temepara George, Katrina Grant, Joline Henry, Laura Langman, Grace Rasmussen, Anna Scarlett, Maria Tutaia, Irene Van Dyk, Casey Williams, Daneka Wipiiti

Pool B

Rugby Sevens

Summary

Group A 

Group Results

Quarter Final

Semi Final

Gold Medal Match
----

Weightlifting

Men

See also
 2010 Commonwealth Games

References

Nations at the 2010 Commonwealth Games
2010